Plexin-A3 is a protein that in humans is encoded by the PLXNA3 gene.

References

Further reading